Ankerwycke Priory was a priory of Benedictine nuns in Buckinghamshire, England. It was established around 1160 and dissolved in 1536. Excavations were carried out at the priory in 2022.

References

External links
3D scan of the ruins from the National Trust

Monasteries in Buckinghamshire
1160 establishments in England
1536 disestablishments in England
Christian monasteries established in the 12th century
Benedictine nunneries in England